The SV Paul was a four-masted fore-and-aft rigged windjammer, launched in Seattle in 1919. Originally named Mount Whitney she was sold to new German owners in 1924 and renamed Margaret Sayer, finally in 1925 she was acquired by Flensburg owners and renamed 'Paul'.

Shipwreck and salvage

In 1925 the Paul crossed the Atlantic from Cadiz to St. John, Newfoundland and loaded 2,000 tons of timber at Halifax for Dublin. On 30 October she ran into severe gales, losing many sails and her anchors; eventually grounding on the Cefn Sidan sands as without any auxiliary motive power she was unable to make an escape. On this occasion she had a crew of twelve, with a cook, the master and a teenage stewardess Another reference cites her grounding as being on November 5, 1925.

Several tugs came up from Cardiff and failed in an attempt to refloat her. A salvage company took on 26 local men and salvaged the timber cargo. Most of the timber was made into rafts and floated over to the nearby railway line at Bertwn.

Archaeology
Pembrey's Cefn Sidan sands translates as 'silken back', describing the smooth flat stretch of over 7 miles of sand and the Paul is the largest remaining timber wreck to be seen on the Cefn Sidan sands of the 182 vessels are recorded as being wrecked here. The unloaded hulk has shifted position and coastline alterations mean that she now lies within the Gwendraeth estuary. The construction being massive, and the site being protected from the worst of the storms has meant that the wreck has only slowly broken up. The substantial timbers held together by innumerable wrought-iron fastenings are still apparent. Much has been stripped from the wreck over the years and bullet holes indicate its use as a target before the establishment of the holiday camp.

Local history

Significant quantities of the Paul's cargo are said to have ended up in the hands of locals. Long prior to the Paul's loss, locals had become known as the 'Gwyr-y-bwelli-bach' (literally hatchet men), because in local legend they were accused of displaying lights to confuse and then attract shipping onto the sands. A so-called 'Wrecker's' window survives in Bryn Towi cottage on the lane running up to Tanylan Farm from the Gwendraeth and the old farm of Tanylan Isaf (previously Danylan) nearby has beams made from ship's timbers.

The aforementioned hatchets of the gwyr-y-bwelli-bach were said used to have been used to cut off swollen fingers of casualties bearing gold rings, etc. Fifty arrests are known to have been made of locals plundering wrecked vessels over the years and at least thirty mariners are unfortunate enough to have perished on the sands of the Cefn Sidan area.

According to local accounts, an attempt to salvage the entire ship failed.  The ship was filled below deck with barrels, hoping that the extra buoyancy would raise the ship at high tide.  Unfortunately, all this achieved was the decking gave way under the force, ruining most of the integrity of the ship and making it practically impossible to salvage whole.  Part of the wreck is still there to this day (as of 2022).

See also
 Shipwrecks
 List of shipwrecks

References

External links
 Pembrey Park and Cefn Sidan

Cargo ships of Germany
Shipwrecks in the Bristol Channel
Archaeology of shipwrecks
Windjammers
Ships built in Seattle
1919 ships
Shipwrecks of Wales
Maritime incidents in 1925